Samatra is a small village located in the Kutch district of Gujarat state, India. The first settlement was established by two Varsani brothers by the names of Velji Bapa and Manji Bapa. From this other families, such as, the Gami, Pindoria, Hirani, Bhanderi, Kerai and Bhudiya families, gradually joined in and strengthened and united the community as a whole. However, this is not the earliest known Varsani history. In 1386, in a small village called Savalia, it is acknowledged that Varsanis once lived here before travelling and inhabiting several other small villages until finally settling down.

The village of Samatra is located on a substantially big hill, thus making its surrounding slopes naturally attractive and unique amongst the other nearby villages. It is one of twenty-four main villages of the Leva Patel Samaj in Kutch and is situated only 12 miles west of Bhuj, the nearest city, on the main state highway to Narayan Sarovar - Tirth Dhaam.

One of the key advantages of living in Samatra is that one gets access to a secluded village by the name of Fotdi, which is smaller by choice compared to Samatra. They are separated by a 3-mile road, lined with farms on both sides.

The village of Samatra has since evolved with time. many captivating buildings and architectural sites can now be seen in the village. Amongst these are the two Swaminarayan Temples for men and women and the Samaj Community Centre. Several other Hanuman and Mahadev mandirs can also be seen. Also after the extensive development program and tree plantations, the Ujaani Talav has transformed into a beautiful lake and a place of pilgrimage.

Worldwide Kutchi Kanbi communities can be found in the US, Canada, Uganda, Kenya, Mauritius, Seychelles, Australia, Portugal, Switzerland, Sultanate of Oman, UAE and a vast population in the UK. The first wave of migration from Kutch were to Uganda, Tanzania and Kenya, in the early 1930s, in the search of a better life. The 1960s and 1970s saw the immigration of Kanbis to the UK and USA. In the 1970s and 1980s many Kanbis secured working in the Middle East.

Since immigration to many parts of the world, people of Samatra has established the organization in order to maintain links to their place of origin. These organizations have since helped to achieve its purpose and maintain links through various educational, religious, social and sporting activities. This unity that has nurtured has become stronger over the years has helped set up various projects in their home village of Samatra.

Unlike other typical villages in Kutch, Samatra village have taken an innovative approach towards the wandering cows. The new dairy factory commenced just recently (2017) on the outskirt of samatra is helping the cows with food every day and in return the people of village get natural milk delivered straight to their home every day.

Samatra TV tower

Standing tall and strong at 300 metres (980 feet) is the eighth tallest tower in India and ranks at number 38 in the whole world. Considering it was completed in 1999 the engineering effort for a small village to construct such a tower at that era symbolizes great unity in the village. List of tallest structure in India

Umrasar Tadav

Some attraction in Samatra village is the well known Umrasar Tadav where the lake is always cleaned and animals like alligator have learned to live with the kind people of the village and on the other hand people are not seeing them as a threat hence not killing them. Slowly but surely, more and more people are becoming aware of the importance of storing rain water in underground river beds. Samatra is lucky to have Vamasar Talao which sips in all its water 3 months, storing its water underground. Adjacent to its Ujaani Talao which stores water over ground for up to 3 years for cattle and wild life. There are other talaos like Zoliari, Naani Talao and Thaawar-wari around Samatra. Vaaghrai - check dam was recently built in the west to serve the deprived wild life of the area. Streams from the surrounding hills are diverted into the catchment area and the straight into the wells through pipelines to bring the water table level up and sustain the water supply.

Clean Samatra
Samatra also known as green and clean Samatra because people from the village has helped to maintain the cleanliness and taken hygiene as there number one priority in their daily lives. In 2016 Samatra village was entitled the second most cleanest village in kutch by Clean Air Asia. Samatra seemed to catch the eyes of large news company such as TV9 GUJARAT who wasted no time airing how residents of Samatra have joined hands to have a clean and hygienic environment. See: TV9 GUJARAT

This is a beginning and much needs to be done, using these techniques for all villages. Godpar, Meghpar, Naranpar, Kera, Baladia have joined the league and taken the lead. Other villages must follow the example for it is in the interest of the Indian people to improve and enrich the ecology and general environment they live in.

See also 
 Samatra TV Tower

External links 
 Samatra - Shree Samatra Leva Patel Community (UK) Online

Villages in Kutch district